Bobby Witt may refer to two American baseball players:

 Bobby Witt Jr. (born 2000), shortstop and third baseman for the Kansas City Royals
 Bobby Witt Sr. (born 1964), pitcher for several teams, father of Bobby Jr.

See also 
 Robert Witt (disambiguation)
 Witt (disambiguation)